John Andrew Crossan (born 29 November 1938) is a Northern Irish author, radio sports analyst, entrepreneur, and former footballer. His brother Eddie was also a player.

Club career
Crossan began his career playing for Derry City, where he played as an inside forward. His talent was spotted by several leading English clubs, including Arsenal and Sunderland. When the latter made a substantial offer, Derry City offered Crossan a payment deal which he rejected, offering his own. When the Sunderland negotiations broke down, Derry City dropped Crossan, who signed for Coleraine. Derry City, still aggrieved by Crossan's actions, reported themselves to the Football League authorities for technical breaches of regulations, thus ensuring that Crossan would face disciplinary action.

In January 1959, a commission of inquiry imposed small fines on Derry and Coleraine, but banned Crossan from all forms of football for life. A partial lifting of the ban was allowed following an appeal, in May 1959 the inside forward signed for Dutch Champions Sparta Rotterdam, where he was first called up to the Northern Ireland squad.

He went from there to Standard Liège, where he played in the semi-final of the European Cup against Real Madrid. In 1963, Crossan returned to football in the UK (following the lifting of his 'life-time' ban) when he was signed by Sunderland, with whom he made it to the old First Division. He then signed for Manchester City who were playing in the old Second Division. As team captain, he helped them make their way into the old First Division, before being sold to Middlesbrough after a loss of form following a car crash and other health problems.

International career
Internationally, he was capped 24 times by Northern Ireland and scored 10 goals.

International goals
 
Scores and results list Northern Ireland's goal tally first.

Management
After his playing days, Crossan had a spell in management and took the top job at League of Ireland club, Sligo Rovers. He resigned soon after.

Media career
He also commentates for BBC Radio Foyle when they cover Derry City games.

References

External links
 
 
 
 The forgotten story of John Crossan's lifetime ban by Simon Burnton, The Guardian 2 Nov 2011

1938 births
Living people
Sportspeople from Derry (city)
Association football forwards
Association footballers from Northern Ireland
Expatriate association footballers from Northern Ireland
Northern Ireland international footballers
Derry City F.C. players
Coleraine F.C. players
Bristol City F.C. players
Sparta Rotterdam players
Standard Liège players
Sunderland A.F.C. players
Manchester City F.C. players
Middlesbrough F.C. players
NIFL Premiership players
K.S.K. Tongeren players
Eredivisie players
Belgian Pro League players
Expatriate footballers in the Netherlands
Expatriate footballers in Belgium
English Football League players
Sligo Rovers F.C. managers
League of Ireland managers
Northern Ireland amateur international footballers
Football managers from Northern Ireland